This is a list of notable bands and musicians who performed primarily ska or ska-influenced music for a significant portion of their careers.

Original (starting in late 1950s)

Aubrey Adams
Laurel Aitken
Roland Alphonso
Theophilus Beckford
Val Bennett
Baba Brooks
The Blues Busters
Prince Buster
The Clarendonians
Jimmy Cliff
Clue J & His Blues Blasters
Stranger Cole
Desmond Dekker
Don Drummond
Jackie Edwards
Alton Ellis
The Ethiopians
Owen Gray
Derrick Harriott
Justin Hinds
Jah Jerry Haynes
Lloyd Knibb
Byron Lee & the Dragonaires
Count Machuki
Carlos Malcolm
Tommy McCook
The Melodians
Johnny "Dizzy" Moore
Derrick Morgan
Eric "Monty" Morris
Jackie Opel
The Paragons
Lee "Scratch" Perry
Lord Tanamo
The Pioneers
Ernest Ranglin
Rico Rodriguez
The Skatalites
The Silvertones
Millie Small
Symarip
Lynn Taitt
Toots & the Maytals
The Wailers
Delroy Wilson

2 Tone ska revival (starting in late 1970s)

The Apollinaires
Pauline Black
Bad Manners
Mike Barson
The Beat/The English Beat
Mark Bedford
Buster Bloodvessel
The Bodysnatchers
John Bradbury
Andy Cox
Rhoda Dakar
Jerry Dammers
Judge Dread
Chris Foreman
Lynval Golding
Terry Hall
Madness
Everett Morton
Horace Panter
Roddy Radiation
Ranking Roger
The Selecter
Chas Smash
The Specials
Neville Staple
Suggs
Lee Thompson
Dave Wakeling
Daniel Woodgate

Third wave ska (starting in early 1980s)

Against All Authority
Allniters
Animal Chin
The Aquabats
Area-7
The Arrogant Sons of Bitches
Athena
BeNuts
Blue Meanies
Big D and the Kids Table
Bim Skala Bim
The Bruce Lee Band
Buck-O-Nine
The Busters
Catch 22
Cherry Poppin' Daddies
The Chinkees
Choking Victim
Chris Murray
Citizen Fish
Common Rider
The Crazy 8s
Dance Hall Crashers
Deal's Gone Bad
Desorden Publico
Distemper
Doe Maar
The Donkey Show
Downfall
Edna's Goldfish
The Expendables
Falling Sickness
Farse
Fishbone
Five Iron Frenzy
Fuzigish
The Gadjits
Gals Panic
General Rudie
Go Jimmy Go
GOGO13
Goldfinger
Hepcat
The Hippos
The Hotknives
The Impossibles
Inspecter 7
The Insyderz
Jeffries Fan Club
Johnny Socko
Kemuri
King Apparatus
The Kingpins
The Know How
Lightyear
Leftöver Crack
Less Than Jake
Let's Go Bowling
Link 80
Long Shot Party
Los Fabulosos Cadillacs
Mad Caddies
Mark Foggo's Skasters
Mealticket
Me Mom and Morgentaler
Mephiskapheles
The Mighty Mighty Bosstones
Monkey
Mr. Review
Mu330
Mustard Plug
No Doubt
Nuckle Brothers
The O.C. Supertones
Operation Ivy
Panteón Rococó
The Pietasters
Pilfers
The Planet Smashers
The Porkers
Potshot
Pressure Cooker
Rancid
Reel Big Fish
The Rough Kutz
Ruder Than You
The Rudiments
Rx Bandits
Save Ferris
The Scholars
The Scofflaws
The Siren Six!
Ska-P
Skankin' Pickle
Skavoovie and the Epitones
Skinnerbox
The Skoidats
The Skunks
The Slackers
Slapstick
Slow Gherkin
Spunge
Spring Heeled Jack
Stubborn All-Stars
Subb
Sublime
Suburban Legends
Suburban Rhythm
The Suicide Machines
Superhiks
The Toasters
Tokyo Ska Paradise Orchestra
The Uptones
The Untouchables
Tijuana No!
Voodoo Glow Skulls

Post-third wave (starting in early 2000s)

Bandits of the Acoustic Revolution
Beebs and Her Money Makers
Bomb The Music Industry!
The Brass Action
Capdown
The Cat Empire
Chase Long Beach
The Flatliners
Folly
The Forces of Evil
Gollbetty
High School Football Heroes
Howards Alias
Hub City Stompers
The Interrupters
I Voted for Kodos
J-Stars
Jeff Rosenstock
The Johnstones
The King Blues
King Prawn
Kingston Rudieska
Lightyear
Locomondo
The Locos
Missing Andy
Murphy's Kids
No Torso
Oreskaband
Orpheus
The Orobians
Pannonia Allstars Ska Orchestra
Random Hand
RedSka
Rude King
Russkaja
The Rudimentals
Ska Cubano
The Skints
Slightly Stoopid
SOJA
Sonic Boom Six
Sounds Like Chicken
Starpool
Streetlight Manifesto
The Supervillains
Survay Says!
Talco
Tip the Van
The Unlimiters
The Upgrades
Westbound Train
We Are the Union

References

Ska
!